Adalberto Almeida y Merino (Bachíniva, Chihuahua, June 6, 1916 – Chihuahua, Chihuahua, June 21, 2008) was a Mexican prelate of the Roman Catholic Church who served as Bishop of Tulancingo, 1956–1962; Bishop of Zacatecas, 1962–1969 and Archbishop of Chihuahua, 1969–1991.

Early life
He was born on June 6, 1916, in the village of Bachíniva, Chihuahua, the son of Luis Almeida Alderete and María Merino Sáenz. He received his early schooling in his home village before entering the Conciliar Seminary of Chihuahua in 1930, motivated by his parish priest, Vicente Hurtado Saldaña, who had asked for his admittance to the then Bishop of Chihuahua Antonio Guízar y Valencia.

Priesthood
He attended several seminaries: Chihuahua, Durango, San Luis Potosí y Veracruz. He also attended the Pontifical Gregorian University where he graduated in Philosophy, Dogmatic Theology and Canon Law. He was ordained on April 23, 1943, at the Church of the Gesu in Rome by Luigi Traglia. In 1946 he returned to Chihuahua where he taught at the Conciliar Seminary.

Episcopate
On May 28, 1956, Almeida was appointed by Pope Pius XII Bishop of Tulancingo, succeeding Miguel Darío Miranda y Gómez (who in turn was appointed Archbishop of Mexico), and taking charge of one of the poorest bishoprics in Mexico at that time. He was consecrated bishop on August 14, 1956, by Guízar of Chihuahua, who had earlier been responsible for his admittance to the seminary. Pope John XXIII appointed him in 1962, just before convening the Second Vatican Council, as the ninth Bishop of Zacatecas. During his bishopric he attended all four sessions of the Second Vatican Council, and celebrated the centennial of the Diocese. On August 24, 1969, Pope Paul VI appointed him to succeed Guizar as second Archbishop of Chihuahua. Through his adaptation of the Social Christian Doctrine as elaborated by the Second Vatican Council, he actively evangelized the less fortunate members of society, and  established the permanent Diaconate in the archdiocese. He is also noted as having increased substantially priestly vocations, the establishment of new religious orders, and the founding of new parishes within Chihuahua. He resigned in 1991, becoming Archbishop Emeritus on June 24 during the celebrations of the centennial of the erection of the Diocese.

Later years
Almeida remained a beloved figure and active in the archdiocese after his retirement, celebrating daily Mass and ministering to the faithful until his death at age 92 on June 21, 2008. He is buried in the crypt of the Cathedral of Chihuahua.

External links
 Remembrances of Mons. Almeida (in Spanish)
 

People from Chihuahua (state)
1916 births
2008 deaths
Participants in the Second Vatican Council
20th-century Roman Catholic archbishops in Mexico
20th-century venerated Christians
21st-century venerated Christians
Mexican Servants of God
Roman Catholic archbishops of Tulancingo
Mexican Roman Catholic archbishops